Metarhizium is a genus of entomopathogenic fungi in the Clavicipitaceae family.  With the advent of genetic profiling,  placing these fungi in proper taxa has now become possible. Most turn out to be the asexual forms (anamorphs) of fungi in the phylum Ascomycota, including Metacordyceps spp.

Species 
Before molecular techniques were introduced at the end of the 20th century, Metarhizium species were identified on morphological (notably conidial) characteristics.  The 'original' species included: M. anisopliae (with M.a. var. major), M. brunneum, M. cicadinum, M. cylindrosporum, M. flavoviride, M. taii, M. truncatum,  and M. viridicolumnare.  
In 2009, nine former varieties of the type species M. anisopliae were assigned species status.  New species have continued to be identified, with original names sometimes re-instated (notably M. brunneum). The first complete chromosome length genome sequence for any Metarhizium was carried-out for this species at Swansea University in 2021.

The index fungorum currently (2021) lists:
 Metarhizium aciculare H. Iwasaki, Tokiwa & Nonaka (2019)
 Metarhizium acridum (Driver & Milner) J.F. Bisch., S.A. Rehner & Humber (2009) (previously M. anisopliae var. acridum)
 Metarhizium alvesii R.B. Lopes, M. Faria, C. Montalva & R.A. Humber (2018)
 Metarhizium anisopliae (Metschn.) Sorokīn (1883)
 Metarhizium argentinense A.C. Gutierrez, A. Leclerque & C.C. Lopez Lastra (2019)
 Metarhizium atrovirens (Kobayasi & Shimizu) Kepler, S.A. Rehner & Humber (2014)
 Metarhizium baoshanense Z.H. Chen, Ling Xu, X.N. Yang, Y.G. Zhang & Y.M. Yang (2018)
 Metarhizium bibionidarum O. Nishi & H. Sato (2017)
 Metarhizium blattodeae C. Montalva, Humber, K. Collier & C. Luz (2016)
 Metarhizium brachyspermum Koh. Yamam., Ohmae & Orihara (2019)
 Metarhizium brasiliense Kepler, S.A. Rehner & Humber (2014)
 Metarhizium brittlebankisoides (Zuo Y. Liu, Z.Q. Liang, Whalley, Y.J. Yao & A.Y. Liu) Kepler, S.A. Rehner & Humber (2014)
 Metarhizium brunneum Petch (1935)
 Metarhizium campsosterni (W.M. Zhang & T.H. Li) Kepler, S.A. Rehner & Humber (2014)
 Metarhizium carneum (Duché & R. Heim) Kepler, S.A. Rehner & Humber (2014)
 Metarhizium chaiyaphumense Tasan., Khons., Thanakitp., Mongkols. & Luangsa-ard (2017)
 Metarhizium cicadinum (Höhn.) Petch (1931)
 Metarhizium cylindrosporum Q.T. Chen & H.L. Guo (1986)
 Metarhizium dendrolimatilis Z.Q. Liang, Wan H. Chen, Y.F. Han & X. Zou (2017)
 Metarhizium flavoviride W. Gams & Rozsypal (1973)
 Metarhizium frigidum J.F. Bisch. & S.A. Rehner (2007)
 Metarhizium gaoligongense Z.H. Chen & L. Xu (2018)
 Metarhizium globosum J.F. Bisch., S.A. Rehner & Humber (2009)
 Metarhizium granulomatis (Sigler) Kepler, S.A. Rehner & Humber (2014)
 Metarhizium gryllidicola Khons., Thanakitp. & Luangsa-ard (2020)
 Metarhizium guniujiangense (C.R. Li, B. Huang, M.Z. Fan & Z.Z. Li) Kepler, S.A. Rehner & Humber (2014)
 Metarhizium indigoticum (Kobayasi & Shimizu) Kepler, S.A. Rehner & Humber (2014)
 Metarhizium kalasinense Tasan., Khons., Thanakitp., Mongkols. & Luangsa-ard (2017)
 Metarhizium khaoyaiense (Hywel-Jones) Kepler, S.A. Rehner & Humber (2014)
 Metarhizium koreanum Kepler, S.A. Rehner & Humber (2014)
 Metarhizium kusanagiense (Kobayasi & Shimizu) Kepler, S.A. Rehner & Humber (2014)
 Metarhizium lepidiotae (Driver & Milner) J.F. Bisch., S.A. Rehner & Humber (2009)
 Metarhizium lepidopterorum W.H. Chen, Y.F. Han, J.D. Liang & Z.Q. Liang (2019)
 Metarhizium majus (J.R. Johnst.) J.F. Bisch., S.A. Rehner & Humber (2009)
 Metarhizium marquandii (Massee) Kepler, S.A. Rehner & Humber (2014)
 Metarhizium minus (Rombach, Humber & D.W. Roberts) Kepler, S.A. Rehner & Humber (2014)
 Metarhizium novozealandicum (Driver & Milner) Kepler, S.A. Rehner & Humber (2014)
 Metarhizium owariense (Kobayasi) Kepler, S.A. Rehner & Humber (2014)
 Metarhizium pemphigi (Driver & Milner) Kepler, Humber & S.A. Rehner (2014)
 Metarhizium phasmatodeae Khons., Thanakitp. & Luangsa-ard (2020)
 Metarhizium prachinense Tasan., Khons., Thanakitp., Mongkols. & Luangsa-ard (2017)
 Metarhizium pseudoatrovirens (Kobayasi & Shimizu) Kepler, S.A. Rehner & Humber (2014)
 Metarhizium purpureogenum O. Nishi, S. Shimizu & H. Sato (2017)
 Metarhizium reniforme (Samson & H.C. Evans) Luangsa-ard, Boucias & Hywel-Jones (2017)
 Metarhizium rileyi (Farl.) Kepler, S.A. Rehner & Humber (2014)
 Metarhizium robertsii J.F. Bisch., S.A. Rehner & Humber (2009)
 Metarhizium rongjiangense W.H. Chen, Y.F. Han, J.D. Liang & Z.Q. Liang (2019)
 Metarhizium samlanense Luangsa-ard, Thanakitp., Tasan., Mongkols. & Hywel-Jones (2017)
 Metarhizium taii Z.Q. Liang & A.Y. Liu (1991)
 Metarhizium takense Tasan., Thanakitp., Mongkols. & Luangsa-ard (2017)
 Metarhizium truncatum Petch (1931)
 Metarhizium viride (Segretain, Fromentin, Destombes, Brygoo & Dodin ex Samson) Kepler, S.A. Rehner & Humber (2014)
 Metarhizium viridicolumnare (Matsush.) Matsush. (1993)
 Metarhizium viridulum (Tzean, L.S. Hsieh, J.L. Chen & W.J. Wu) B. Huang & Z.Z. Li (2004)
 Metarhizium yongmunense (G.H. Sung, J.M. Sung & Spatafora) Kepler, S.A. Rehner & Humber (2014)

Other Reclassified Species Names
 M. album Petch, 1931 is now assigned to M. anisopliae
 M. glutinosum is now placed in the Stachybotryaceae as Albifimbria (Myrothecium) verrucaria (Alb. & Schwein.) L. Lombard & Crous
 M. martiale is now placed as Nigelia martiale (Speg.) Luangsa-ard & Thanakitp. (Clavicipitaceae).

Teleomorphs
The teleomorphs of Metarhizium species appear to be members of the genus Metacordyceps. Metacordyceps taii (as Cordyceps taii) has been described as the teleomorph of Metarhizium taii:
 a name that has now been restored.

Whether the other varieties of M. anisopliae have their own teleomorphs is not yet clear. Some, if not most, strains of M. anisopliae possibly have lost the capability of reproducing sexually.

Natural pesticide 
The artificially grown fungi's spores are also used as a natural pesticide. Certain strains are advised against use in food-growing fields and in close proximity to water sources due to risk of their contamination.

Locust control
In the 1990s, the LUBILOSA research programme proved that M. acridum in its spore form was effective in killing locusts and other members of the Acrididea families with no deleterious effects found in field trials on any nontarget species except for the domesticated silk worm Bombyx mori. It is currently produced as a biopesticide under the name Novacrid by the company Eléphant Vert in their factory in Meknès, Morocco. The same company recently (2019) obtained the licence to produce and market the original product developed by LUBILOSA, which is called Green Muscle. A third product, Green Guard, is produced by BASF of Australia for the control of Australian plague locusts and wingless grasshoppers.

Notes

References

External links

Sordariomycetes genera
Clavicipitaceae
Parasitic fungi